Ursus dolinensis (the Gran Dolina bear) is an extinct mammalian carnivore species of the Ursidae family. Its fossilized remains were unearthed from the lowest layers of the stratigraphic sequence at the archaeological and paleontological site of Gran Dolina (also Trinchera Dolina, a section of the Trinchera Ferrocaril, lit. Railroad trenches), that is a part of the Atapuerca Mountains complex in the Burgos province, northern Spain. The species was described by Nuria Garcia and Juan Luis Arsuaga in a 2001 publication. Skeletal fossils, mainly cranial fragments were recovered from the sediment units TD 3 and in particular TD 4 (TD = Trinchera Dolina). Presence in these layers suggests a chronology in between 900,000 and 780,000 years ago, which falls into the Calabrian stage of the early Pleistocene.

Morphology
The species has been described as the most primitive of all cave bears, and smaller than a black bear. It has a slender body comparable to brown bears (Ursus arctos) and noticeably gracile features of the cranial and mandibular bones, that to some extent resemble those of Ursus arctos and Ursus etruscus. Yet its overall morphological characteristics suggest a kinship with the line of the speloid bears. Finally Garcia and Arsuaga have concluded that Ursus dolinensis "is the ancestor of Ursus savini and to be very close to the common ancestor of Ursus arctos".

Several paratype fossils include an incomplete right mandible, a right lower molar, another lower molar, two jaw fragments, one phalanx bone of the foot and a metatarsal bone. The discovery of a complete Ursus dolinensis skull during the 2012 excavation campaign and its analysis has according to the campaign's co-directors Eudald Carbonell, J.M. Bermúdez and J.L. Arsuaga helped to better determine the specie's phylogenetic position.

Nuria Garcia described more of the species' specific morphology in a comparison with the Untermaßfeld bear at the 18th International Senckenberg Conference in Weimar in 2004. She confirms the primitive brown bear-like features and highlights detailed dental traits shared by the two species, such as a "slender horizontal ramus with straight vertical profile; all teeth sides converge towards the midline". The fourth lower premolars are massive and elliptical shaped with a prominent protoconid. The first lower molars are slender, the second lower molars are rectangular shaped and without medial constrictions. The fourth upper premolars are triangular shaped with simple high pointed cusps. The first upper molars are quadrangular to rectangular-shaped without central constriction and finally, the second upper molars are large without torsion.

Notes 
 Footnotes

References

External links
 García, Nuria and Arsuaga, Juan Luis (2001). "Ursus dolinensis: a new species of early Pleistocene Ursid from Trinchera Dolina, Atapuerca (Spain) = Ursus dolinensis: une nouvelle espèce d'ursidé inférieur du Pléistocène Trinchera Dolina, Atapuerca (Spain)" . Comptes rendus de l'Académie des sciences. Série 2. Sciences de la terre et des planètes 332 (11). 1251–8050, 717-725 .

Pleistocene bears
Pleistocene species extinctions
Pleistocene carnivorans
Prehistoric mammals of Europe
Fossil taxa described in 2001